The Olympics Karate 2020 Qualification Tournament was held from 11 to 13 June, 2021. The event took place in AccorHotels Arena sports hall, located in Paris, France.

The tournament consisted of four categories for both men and women, as determined for Tokyo 2020. Each NOC had the opportunity to register one athlete for each of the eight categories, with exception to any category where they already have an athlete qualified for Tokyo 2020 through the Olympic Standing of May 2021. The four categories for both men and women included Kata, as well as three other classes created from the combining of the remaining five (WKF) weight categories. Host country athletes (Japan) only were able to register and compete in those categories in which no Japanese athlete is among the 50 highest ranked in the WKF Ranking as of May 2021. Athletes already qualified were not allowed to participate. The three highest placed athletes in each of the eight Olympic events automatically qualified for the Tokyo 2020 Olympic Games respecting the maximum quota per NOC.

Qualification summary

Results

Men

Kata 
Seeds

Round 1

Round 2

Round 3

Round 4

Round-robin

67 kg 
Seeds

Pool 1

Pool 2

Pool 3

Pool 4

Semifinals

Repechage

Round-robin

75 kg 
Seeds

Pool 1

Pool 2

Pool 3

Pool 4

Semifinals

Repechage

Round-robin

+75 kg 
Seeds

Pool 1

Pool 2

Pool 3

Pool 4

Semifinals

Repechage

Round-robin

Women

Kata 
Seeds

Round 1

Round 2

Round 3

Round 4

Round-robin

55 kg 
Seeds

Pool 1

Pool 2

Pool 3

Pool 4

Semifinals

Repechage

Round-robin

61 kg 
Seeds

Pool 1

Pool 2

Pool 3

Pool 4

Semifinals

Repechage

Round-robin

+61 kg 
Seeds

Pool 1

Pool 2

Pool 3

Pool 4

Semifinals

Repechage

Round-robin

References

External links
Results book 

Karate competitions in France
Olympic Qualification Tournament
Karate World Olympic Qualification Tournament
Karate World Olympic Qualification Tournament
Karate